He, Du! is a 1970 East German film directed by Rolf Römer.

External links
 

1970 films
East German films
1970s German-language films
Films set in Berlin
1970s German films